Brazil competed at the 2015 World Championships in Athletics in Beijing, China, from 22 to 30 August 2015.

Medalists

Results
(q – qualified, NM – no mark, SB – season best, AR - Area Record)

Men
Track and road events

Field events

Combined events – Decathlon

Women 
Track and road events

Field events

Combined events – Heptathlon

See also
 Brazil at the World Championships in Athletics

Sources 
Brazilian team

Nations at the 2015 World Championships in Athletics
World Championships in Athletics
2015